The Legislative Assembly of Omsk Oblast is the regional parliament of Omsk Oblast, a federal subject of Russia. A total of 44 deputies are elected for five-year terms.

Elections

2016

2021

List of chairmen 
Vladimir Varnavsky 1994 - present

References 

Politics of Omsk Oblast
Omsk Oblast